Barbara D'Amato (born April 10, 1938 in Grand Rapids, Michigan) is an American mystery author and winner of the Agatha and Anthony Award. She also features in Great Women Mystery Writers (2007).

Biography
She was born Barbara Steketee, the daughter of the owner of the department store Steketee's. She studied at Cornell University but left to marry Anthony D'Amato in 1958. Anthony became a law school professor and Barbara later completed her bachelor's degree from Northwestern University in 1971, followed by a master's. They have two sons Brian (an author and sculptor) and Paul, and live in Chicago.

She began writing full-time in 1973, first co-writing plays with her husband. After trying different genres her first published novel in 1980 was a mystery. She won the Agatha and Anthony Award for a non-fiction work, The Doctor, the Murder, the Mystery: The True Story of the Dr. John Branion Murder Case based on a case her husband worked on in 1984. The book led to the reopening of the case and eventual pardon and release of Branion. In 1999, she served as President of the Mystery Writers of America.

Bibliography

Gerritt De Graaf series

The Hands of Healing Murder (1980)
The Eyes on Utopia Murders (1981)

Cat Marsala series

Hardball (1989)
Hard Tack (1991)
Hard Luck (1992)
Hard Women (1993)
Hard Case (1994)
Hard Christmas (1995)
Hard Bargain (1997)
Hard Evidence (1999)
Hard Road (2001)

Figueroa and Bennis series

Killer.app (1996)
Good Cop, Bad Cop (1998)
Help Me Please (1999)
Authorized Personnel Only (2000)
Death of a Thousand Cuts (2004)

Other novels
 On My Honor (1989) (writing as Malacai Black)
 White Male Infant (2002)
 Foolproof (2009) (with Jeanne M Dams and Mark Richard Zubro)
 Other Eyes (2011)

Anthologies and collections

Non fiction
The Doctor, the Murder, the Mystery: The True Story of the Dr. John Branion Murder Case (1997)

References

External links

Barbara D'Amato Papers at the Newberry Library

1938 births
Living people
20th-century American novelists
21st-century American novelists
Agatha Award winners
American mystery writers
American women novelists
Anthony Award winners
Cornell University alumni
Northwestern University alumni
Writers from Grand Rapids, Michigan
Writers from Chicago
Women mystery writers
20th-century American women writers
21st-century American women writers
Novelists from Illinois
Novelists from Michigan